The 2019 Auburn Tigers baseball team represented Auburn University in the 2019 NCAA Division I baseball season. The Tigers played their home games at Plainsman Park.

Preseason

Preseason All-American teams

2nd Team
Tanner Burns - Starting Pitcher (D1Baseball)
Will Holland - Middle Infielder (Perfect Game)

3rd Team
Tanner Burns - Starting Pitcher (Collegiate Baseball)
Will Holland - Shortstop (D1Baseball)
Will Holland - Shortstop (NCBWA)

SEC media poll
The SEC media poll was released on February 7, 2019 with the Tigers predicted to finish in fourth place in the Western Division.

Preseason All-SEC teams

1st Team
Tanner Burns - Starting Pitcher

Roster

Schedule and results

† Indicates the game does not count toward the 2019 Southeastern Conference standings.
*Rankings are based on the team's current ranking in the D1Baseball poll.

Atlanta Regional

Record vs. conference opponents

Rankings

2019 MLB draft

References

Auburn
Auburn Tigers baseball seasons
Auburn Tigers baseball
Auburn
College World Series seasons